Davron Atabaev (born 6 July 1993) is a Tajikistani sprinter specialising in the 400 metres. He represented his country at the 2018 World Indoor Championships.

International competitions

Personal bests
Outdoor
100 metres – 10.53 (+1.9 m/s, Dushanbe 2016)
200 metres – 20.95 (+1.8 m/s, Dushanbe 2016) NR
400 metres – 47.60 (Almaty 2017) NR
Indoor
60 metres – 7.09 (Doha 2016)
400 metres – 48.57 (Ashgabat 2017)

References

1993 births
Living people
Tajikistani male sprinters
Athletes (track and field) at the 2010 Summer Youth Olympics
Athletes (track and field) at the 2014 Asian Games
Athletes (track and field) at the 2018 Asian Games
Asian Games competitors for Tajikistan
Competitors at the 2013 Summer Universiade